Başlı is a village in the Besni District, Adıyaman Province, Turkey. Its population is 238 (2021).

The hamlets of Akdere and Dereiçi are attached to the village.

References

Villages in Besni District